Otto Weidinger (27 May 1914 – 10 January 1990) was a member of the Waffen-SS in Nazi Germany and a regimental commander in the SS Division Das Reich during World War II. In this capacity, he was involved in the Oradour massacre in France in June 1944. He was the author of a revisionist account of the division's history, produced under the auspices of HIAG, a Waffen-SS lobby group in post-war West Germany.

World War II

Born in 1914, Otto Weidinger enlisted in the SS-Verfügungstruppe (SS-VT) (precursor to the Waffen-SS) in April 1934. His first assignment was as a camp guard at the Dachau concentration camp. With the SS Division Das Reich, he participated in the invasion of Poland and in the Battle of the Netherlands. During Operation Barbarossa, the invasion of the Soviet Union, he served on the divisional staff. In 1943, Weidinger was posted to the SS Regiment "Germania" and took part in the Battle of Kursk. In April 1944, Weidinger was awarded the Knight's Cross of the Iron Cross. He was promoted to command of the 4th SS Panzer-Grenadier Regiment "Der Führer" stationed in Normandy coastline.  He fought with the division throughout the war, his final operation was covering the evacuation of 'Volksdeutsche' from Prague in the War's final days.

When World War II ended, Weidinger was held at the Dachau internment camp administered by the US Army. In August 1947, he was transferred to French custody, where he was charged with war crimes and stood trial in 1951. Weidinger was acquitted by a military court in Bordeaux in June 1951. At the trial of the perpetrators of the Oradour-sur-Glane massacre in Bordeaux in January 1953, Weidinger was a witness for the defense.

Post-war apologia
From 1967 to 1982, Weidinger wrote the history of Regiment "Der Führer" and a multi-volume history of "Das Reich" published by the right-wing , which was owned by HIAG, a Waffen-SS lobby group. The narrative was extensive and strove for a so-called official representation of the division's history, backed by maps and operational orders. "No less than 5 volumes and well over 2,000 pages were devoted to the doings of the 2nd Panzer Division Das Reich", writes the military historian S.P. MacKenzie.

Munin Verlag's expressed aim was to publish the "war narratives" of former Waffen-SS members, and their titles did not go through the rigorous fact-checking processes common in traditional historical works; they were revisionist accounts unedited by professional historians and presented the former Waffen-SS members' version of events. The Das Reich divisional history, like other HIAG publications, focused on the positive, "heroic" side of National Socialism. The French author , who studied the Oradour massacre, notes the tendentious nature of Weidinger's narrative: it provided a sanitized version of history without any references to war crimes.

In 1984, Weidinger self-published a revisionist account of the Tulle massacre, Tulle and Oradour. A German-French tragedy. Re-issued after his death, by the right-wing Nation und Europa, it was subsequently banned in France.

Awards
 Iron Cross (1939) 2nd Class (15 November 1939) & 1st Class (25 July 1940)
 German Cross in Gold on 26 November 1943
 Knight's Cross of the Iron Cross with Oak Leaves and Swords: Knight's Cross on 21 April 1944; Oak Leaves on 26 December  1944
 Swords on 6 May 1945 (?)—No evidence of the award can be found in the German Federal Archives. The award was unlawfully presented by Sepp Dietrich, commander of the 6th Panzer Army. Weidinger was member of the Association of Knight's Cross Recipients.

References

Citations

Bibliography

 
 
 
 
 
 
 

1914 births
1990 deaths
Military personnel from Würzburg
Recipients of the Gold German Cross
Recipients of the Knight's Cross of the Iron Cross with Oak Leaves and Swords
SS-Obersturmbannführer
People from the Kingdom of Bavaria
Waffen-SS personnel
People acquitted of crimes